The 1987 ICI Perspex Men's World Open Squash Championship is the men's edition of the 1987 World Open, which serves as the individual world championship for squash players. The event took place in Birmingham in England from 11 to 20 October 1987. Jansher Khan won his first World Open title, defeating Chris Dittmar in the final.

Seeds

Draw and results

Notes
Jansher Khan won the first of eight world titles.
Gamal Awad received a one-year ban for a physical assault upon the referee Paul Danby. The assault took place during the first round match between Awad and Cerryg Jones.

See also
PSA World Open
1987 Women's World Open Squash Championship

References

External links
World Squash History

M
World Squash Championships
Squash in England
International sports competitions in Birmingham, West Midlands
Squash tournaments in the United Kingdom
1987 in English sport